The sport of association football in Guadeloupe is administered by the Ligue Guadeloupéenne de Football. The association administers the national football team, as well as the Guadeloupe Division d'Honneur. Guadeloupe is not a member of FIFA.

League system

Football stadiums in Guadeloupe

References